Minneapolis City SC (known informally as Mpls City SC or The Crows) is an American soccer club based in Minneapolis, Minnesota, United States. Founded in 2016, the team plays in the USL League Two, the top national league at the fourth tier of the American Soccer Pyramid. The club won three straight NPSL North Conference championships (2018, 2019 and 2021) before joining League Two. Their nickname is The Crows, coined by the club's supporters, which comes from the "Mega Murder" of crows that roost in Minneapolis.

History
Founded in 2016 as an offshoot of Stegman's Soccer Club, team managing director Dan Hoedeman stated that his goal with the team is to re-create the local feeling of the Minnesota Thunder's early days.  As such, every player is a Minnesota resident and the team is owned by "members" who make important decisions for the team, such as the league, colors, logo and budget.

In their inaugural 2016 season in the Premier League of America, the team finished at three wins, four draws and three losses, good for third place in the league's West Division. Their first competitive game was a scoreless draw against Bavarian SC in Milwaukee. The club's first goal was scored by Matthew Gweh in their first home match, a 2–1 win over Croatian Eagles at Les Barnard Field.

That October, they would win their first qualifying match for the 2017 Lamar Hunt U.S. Open Cup, defeating league-mates Oakland County FC by a score of 2–1 in extra time.

In 2017 Minneapolis City SC announced it was joining the National Premier Soccer League.  The team is a member of the North Conference in the Midwest Region

With the win over Oakland County FC, Minneapolis City became the first amateur team from Minnesota to qualify for the U.S. Open Cup proper, but were disqualified from the tournament for switching leagues.

In 2018, Minneapolis City SC clinched the NPSL North Conference title while going undefeated in conference play, one of only five teams in the NPSL to remain unbeaten in the regular season. Additionally, the Crows were the top offensive team in the entire league with 46 goals scored.

They followed that up with the 2019 NPSL North Conference title. Interestingly, after beating Duluth FC 4–2 in the second-to-last match of the season to clinch the 2018 title, the Crows went to Duluth and beat them 4–2 in the second-to-last match of the season to clinch the 2019 title as well.

The 2020 season was cancelled because of COVID so it took until 2021 for the Crows to win their third-straight NPSL North Conference title, which they did in style by beating rival Duluth FC 6-1 in Duluth to secure the title with two games still to play. It was the third season in a row that the Crows beat Duluth to win the conference. In the playoffs, the Crows went on to the Midwest Region Final where they fell to Cleveland SC 2-0. 

In September 2021, the team announced that it would join USL League Two for the 2022 season.

Club culture
Called a "ramshackle, DIY soccer club" by The Growler, and not unfairly as the club has embraced that ethos both as a way to harken back to the original days of pro soccer in Minnesota and as a way to create a "people-driven alternative to corporate pro sports".

Minneapolis City launched a "throwback" style logo and kit before ever playing a game. The kit and logo were designed by designer Matthew Wolff, from Minneapolis, whose credits include the branding for Los Angeles FC, New York City FC, and others.

Supporters
Minneapolis City is a well-supported club at its level, and the Citizens supporter's group is a large reason why.

Known, especially in the North Conference, for being loud, for their tifo, and for humorous in-game heckling, The Citizens are a staple at Crows games.

Affiliates

Stegman's Soccer Club is an amateur soccer club based in Minneapolis. The club fields five competitive amateur men's teams across the two major summer leagues in Minneapolis-St Paul: Stegman's 1977, Stegman's Old Boys, and Stegman's Athletic in the Minnesota Amateur Soccer League (MASL), Stegman's United and Stegman's Blues in the Minnesota Recreational Soccer League (MRSL), and various small-sided teams in various other leagues throughout the year.

In 2021, Minneapolis City created the Minneapolis City Futures Program, a supplementary training program for local players under the age of 20, to bridge the gap between youth and adult soccer in the area.

Rivalries
Though not technically a derby, matches between Minneapolis City SC and Duluth FC are important to supporters and, while City was in the NPSL, were important to the conference title race. The famous 'donkey tifo' of 2017 helped give Duluth FC the nickname "The Donkeys."

The City-Suburbs Derby was contested over the years with Minnesota TwinStars, who typically play in the northern suburbs of Minneapolis. As with any local derby, the games were hotly contested and rife with chicanery and "technical difficulties".

Starting in 2022, Stillwater-based St. Croix SC joined USL League Two and the Twin Cities Derby commenced. Tightly contested on the field, the derby hasn't yet acquired broader significance or traction with supporters.

Players

Roster

Notable players

Minneapolis City players who have been drafted in the MLS SuperDraft include Brandon Bye (New England Revolution), Luke Haakenson (Nashville SC), Xavier Zengue (Columbus Crew), Herbert Endeley (FC Dallas), and Rory O'Driscoll (Nashville SC).

Minneapolis City players who went on to play at professional level include Brandon Bye (New England Revolution), Luke Haakenson (Nashville SC), Loic Mesanvi (Minnesota United 2), Scotty Heinen (Germania Eicherscheid), Matt Gibbons (Germania Eicherscheid), Ian Smith (Oppsal IF), Jakop Popkin (AC Syracuse Pulse), Mitch Wolff (Stumptown FC), Juan Louis (AC Syracuse Pulse), Abbai Habte (Nordvärmlands FF), Miles Stockman-Willis (Vrigstad IF) and Andy Lorei (San Diego Sockers).

Additionally, former Minnesota United player Brian Kallman turned out for the Crows in the 2017 season.

Technical staff
  Carl Craig – Head Coach
  Peter Rivard – Assistant Coach
  Tom Kleczewski – Assistant Coach
  John Pucci – Goalkeeper Coach
  Matt vanBenschoten - General Manager
  Adam Pribyl – Sporting Strategy

Statistics

Season-by-season

Historic record vs opponents 

*Team folded

Honors
 NPSL North Conference Champions (3): 2018, 2019, 2021

References

External links
 

Association football clubs established in 2016
Soccer clubs in Minnesota
National Premier Soccer League teams
Premier League of America teams
Sports in Minneapolis
Sports in Minneapolis–Saint Paul
Minneapolis–Saint Paul
2016 establishments in Minnesota